The 2020 UEFA Women's Under-17 Championship qualifying competition was a women's under-17 football competition that was originally to determine the seven teams joining the automatically qualified hosts Sweden in the 2020 UEFA Women's Under-17 Championship final tournament, before being cancelled due to the COVID-19 pandemic in Europe.

Apart from Sweden, 46 of the remaining 54 UEFA member national teams entered the qualifying competition. Players born on or after 1 January 2003 were eligible to participate.

Format
The qualifying competition consists of two rounds:
 Qualifying round: Apart from Spain and Germany, which receive byes to the elite round as the teams with the highest seeding coefficient, the remaining 44 teams are drawn into 11 groups of four teams. Each group is played in single round-robin format at one of the teams selected as hosts after the draw. The 11 group winners, the 11 runners-up, and the four third-placed teams with the best record against the first and second-placed teams in their group advance to the elite round.
 Elite round: The 28 teams are drawn into seven groups of four teams. Each group is played in single round-robin format at one of the teams selected as hosts after the draw. The seven group winners qualify for the final tournament.

The schedule of each group is as follows, with two rest days between each matchday (Regulations Article 20.04):

Tiebreakers
In the qualifying round and elite round, teams are ranked according to points (3 points for a win, 1 point for a draw, 0 points for a loss), and if tied on points, the following tiebreaking criteria are applied, in the order given, to determine the rankings (Regulations Articles 14.01 and 14.02):
 Points in head-to-head matches among tied teams;
 Goal difference in head-to-head matches among tied teams;
 Goals scored in head-to-head matches among tied teams;
 If more than two teams are tied, and after applying all head-to-head criteria above, a subset of teams are still tied, all head-to-head criteria above are reapplied exclusively to this subset of teams;
 Goal difference in all group matches;
 Goals scored in all group matches;
 Penalty shoot-out if only two teams have the same number of points, and they met in the last round of the group and are tied after applying all criteria above (not used if more than two teams have the same number of points, or if their rankings are not relevant for qualification for the next stage);
 Disciplinary points (red card = 3 points, yellow card = 1 point, expulsion for two yellow cards in one match = 3 points);
 UEFA coefficient ranking for the qualifying round draw;
 Drawing of lots.

To determine the four best third-placed teams from the qualifying round, the results against the teams in fourth place are discarded. The following criteria are applied (Regulations Article 15.01):
 Points;
 Goal difference;
 Goals scored;
 Disciplinary points (total 3 matches);
 UEFA coefficient ranking for the qualifying round draw;
 Drawing of lots.

Qualifying round

Draw
The draw for the qualifying round was held on 23 November 2018, 09:00 CET (UTC+1), at the UEFA headquarters in Nyon, Switzerland.

The teams were seeded according to their coefficient ranking, calculated based on the following:
2015 UEFA Women's Under-17 Championship final tournament and qualifying competition (qualifying round and elite round)
2016 UEFA Women's Under-17 Championship final tournament and qualifying competition (qualifying round and elite round)
2017 UEFA Women's Under-17 Championship final tournament and qualifying competition (qualifying round and elite round)
2018 UEFA Women's Under-17 Championship final tournament and qualifying competition (qualifying round and elite round)

Each group contained one team from Pot A, one team from Pot B, one team from Pot C, and one team from Pot D. Based on the decisions taken by the UEFA Emergency Panel, Russia and Ukraine could not be drawn in the same group.

Notes
Teams marked in bold have qualified for the final tournament.

Groups
The qualifying round is provisionally scheduled between 5 August and 27 October 2019.

Times up to 26 October 2019 are CEST (UTC+2), thereafter times are CET (UTC+1), as listed by UEFA (local times, if different, are in parentheses).

Group 1

Group 2

Group 3

Group 4

Group 5

Group 6

Group 7

Group 8

Group 9

Note: Poland v Kazakhstan, originally to be played on 2 October 2019, 17:15 local time, was postponed to the next day.

Group 10

Group 11

Ranking of third-placed teams
To determine the four best third-placed teams from the qualifying round which advance to the elite round, only the results of the third-placed teams against the first and second-placed teams in their group are taken into account.

Elite round

Draw
The draw for the elite round was held on 29 November 2019, 11:40 CET (UTC+1), at the UEFA headquarters in Nyon, Switzerland.

The teams were seeded according to their results in the qualifying round. Spain and Germany, which received byes to the elite round, were automatically seeded into Pot A. Each group contained one team from Pot A, one team from Pot B, one team from Pot C, and one team from Pot D. Winners and runners-up from the same qualifying round group could not be drawn in the same group, but the best third-placed teams could be drawn in the same group as winners or runners-up from the same qualifying round group. Based on the decisions taken by the UEFA Emergency Panel, Russia and Ukraine could not be drawn in the same group.

Groups
The elite round was originally scheduled to be played between 14 and 29 March 2020. On 12 March 2020, UEFA announced that the elite round had been postponed due to the COVID-19 pandemic. On 17 June 2020, UEFA announced that the elite round had been rescheduled to 12–21 September 2020. However, UEFA announced on 13 August 2020 that after consultation with the 55 member associations, the tournament had been cancelled.

Times are CEST (UTC+2), as listed by UEFA (local times, if different, are in parentheses).

Group 1
Originally scheduled to be played between 22 and 28 March 2020.

Group 2
Originally scheduled to be played between 18 and 24 March 2020.

Group 3
Originally scheduled to be played between 23 and 29 March 2020.

Group 4
Originally scheduled to be played between 14 and 20 March 2020.

Group 5
Originally scheduled to be played between 16 and 22 March 2020.

Group 6
Originally scheduled to be played between 19 and 25 March 2020.

Group 7
Originally scheduled to be played between 23 and 29 March 2020.

Qualified teams
The following eight teams qualify for the final tournament.

1 Bold indicates champions for that year. Italic indicates hosts for that year.

Goalscorers
In the qualifying round,

References

External links

Women's Under-17 Matches: 2020 Qualifying, UEFA.com

Qualification
2020
2019 in women's association football
2020 in women's association football
2019 in youth association football
2020 in youth association football
September 2019 sports events in Europe
October 2019 sports events in Europe
Association football events curtailed due to the COVID-19 pandemic